The 2015–16 Temple Owls women's basketball team will represent Temple University during the 2015–16 NCAA Division I women's basketball season. The season marks the third for the Owls as members of the American Athletic Conference. The Owls, led by eighth year head coach Tonya Cardoza, played their home games at McGonigle Hall with four games at the Liacouras Center. They finished the season 23–12, 13–5 in AAC play to finish in third place. They advanced to the semifinals of the American Athletic women's tournament where they lost to South Florida. They were invited to the Women's National Invitation Tournament where they defeated Drexel, Quinnipiac and Ohio in the first, second and third rounds before losing to Michigan in the quarterfinals.

Media
All Owls home games will have video streaming on Owls TV, ESPN3, or AAC Digital. Road games will typically be streamed on the opponents website, though conference road games could also appear on ESPN3 or AAC Digital. There are no radio broadcasts for Owls women's basketball games. You can listen to audio of most games through the opponents website.

Roster

Schedule and results

|-
! colspan="12" style="background:#9e1b34; color:#fff;"| Exhibition

|-
! colspan="12" style="background:#9e1b34; color:#fff;"| Regular season

|-
! colspan="12" style="background:#9e1b34; color:#fff;"| American Athletic Conference Women's Tournament

|-
! colspan="12" style="background:#9e1b34; color:#fff;"| WNIT

See also
2015–16 Temple Owls men's basketball team
Temple Owls women's basketball

References

Temple Owls women's basketball seasons
Temple
2016 Women's National Invitation Tournament participants
Temple
Temple